Darageh-ye Molla Ali Karam (also Romanized as Darageh-ye Mollā ʿAlī Karam; also known as Darakeh-ye Mollaalīkaram) is a village in Mahidasht Rural District, Mahidasht District, Kermanshah County, Kermanshah Province, Iran. At the 2006 census, its population was 111, in 26 families.

References 

Populated places in Kermanshah County